ETR 450 (ElettroTrenoRapido 450) was the first series Italian tilting train (also called Pendolino).

History
The Pendolino project was started in the 1970s by FIAT Ferroviaria. Development included a number of prototypes, the last of which was the ETR 401. This prototype was followed by the ETR 450 series units. The first train entered service on between Rome and Milan in 1988.

Every train is made up of 9 units. The ETR 450 were in use on the Rome-Bari, Rome-Ancona-Rimini and Genoa-Florence - Rome lines. It was relegated to lower services with the introduction of the next generation of Pendolino trains (ETR 460, ETR 480) and non-tilting high-speed trains (ETR 500).

From 2015, all trains are out of service.

Characteristics
Construction years: 1987 - 1992
Max. speed (in service): 
Max. tilting angle: 8°
Total number of seats: 390 (220 II + 170 I)

See also
ElettroTreno
Eurostar Italia
New Pendolino
Pendolino
Rete Ferroviaria Italiana
Trenitalia
Treno Alta Velocità
 List of high speed trains

External links

Pendolino
High-speed trains of Italy
ETR 450
Fiat Ferroviaria
Italian streamliner trains
3000 V DC multiple units